Sultan Abdiqadir Abdillahi was the seventh Grand Sultan of the Isaaq Sultanate. He ruled from 1969 to 1975, when he died. He was succeeded by his son, Mahamed Abdiqadir.

References 

20th-century Somalian people
Somali sultans
Somalian Muslims
1975 deaths
Year of birth missing

Grand Sultans of the Isaaq Sultanate